Parliamentary elections were held in North Korea on 25 November 1967. Only one candidate was presented in each constituency, all of which were selected by the Workers' Party of Korea, although some ran under the banner of other parties or state organisations to give the illusion of democracy. Voter turnout was reported to be 100%, with 100% voting in favour of the candidates presented.

For the first time, the representative of Korean residents in Japan were elected as deputies. The first session (14–16 December 1967) finished with the declaration "Let Us Embody More Thoroughly Revolutionary Spirit of Independence, Self-Sustenance, and Self-Defense in All Fields of State Activity".

Significance of the leader's seat
In his speech after his win in the Songrim constituency, he pointed out the area's importance as a major base for the proletariat class and a place where Hwanghae Steel Mill, one of the country's major steel mills, is located.

Results

References

External links
North Korean parliamentary election, 1967 at Inter-Parliamentary Union

Elections in North Korea
Parliamentary
North Korea
Supreme People's Assembly
North Korea
Election and referendum articles with incomplete results